Idaho Legislative District 20 is one of 35 districts of the Idaho Legislature. It is currently represented by Chuck Winder, Republican  of Boise, Joe Palmer, Republican of  Meridian, and James Holtzclaw, Republican of Meridian.

District profile (1992–2002) 
From 1992 to 2002, District 20 consisted of Owyhee and a portion Elmore County.

District profile (2002–2012) 
From 2002 to 2012, District 20 consisted of a portion of Ada County.

District profile (2012–present) 
District 20 currently consists of a portion of  Ada County.

See also

 List of Idaho Senators
 List of Idaho State Representatives

References

External links
Idaho Legislative District Map (with members)
Idaho Legislature (official site)

20
Ada County, Idaho